Walter Evan Black Jr. (July 7, 1926 – September 29, 2014) was a United States district judge of the United States District Court for the District of Maryland.

Education and career

Born in Baltimore, Maryland, Black received an Artium Baccalaureus degree from Harvard University in 1947 and a Bachelor of Laws from Harvard Law School in 1949. He was in private practice in Baltimore from 1949 to 1953. He served as an Assistant United States Attorney of the District of Maryland from 1953 to 1955, and was himself the United States Attorney for the District of Maryland from 1956 to 1957. He then returned to private practice in Baltimore until 1982.

Federal judicial service

On March 11, 1982, Black was nominated by President Ronald Reagan to a seat on the United States District Court for the District of Maryland vacated by Judge Edward Skottowe Northrop. Black was confirmed by the United States Senate on April 20, 1982, and received his commission on April 21, 1982. He served as Chief Judge from 1991 to 1994, assuming senior status on October 21, 1994. He took inactive senior status on June 30, 2003, meaning he remained a Judge of the court but no longer heard cases or participated in court business, remaining in that status until his death.

Death

Black died in Easton, Maryland on September 29, 2014 from complications of Parkinson's disease.

References

Sources
 

1926 births
2014 deaths
Judges of the United States District Court for the District of Maryland
United States district court judges appointed by Ronald Reagan
20th-century American judges
Harvard Law School alumni
Assistant United States Attorneys
United States Attorneys for the District of Maryland
Neurological disease deaths in Maryland
Deaths from Parkinson's disease